Alan John Gilzean (22 October 1938 – 8 July 2018) was a Scottish professional footballer, active from 1955 to 1975. A striker, Gilzean played most prominently for Dundee and Tottenham Hotspur, and also appeared in 22 international games for Scotland. He helped Dundee win the Scottish league championship in 1961–62 and Tottenham win the FA Cup in 1967, two League Cups (1971 and 1973) and the 1971–72 UEFA Cup. He died on 8 July 2018 after being diagnosed with a brain tumour.

Playing career

Dundee
Gilzean began his career with local side Coupar Angus Juniors, before signing provisional forms with Dundee in January 1956 as a 17-year-old amateur. He played once for their youth team Dundee Violet, but then played again for Coupar Angus while working as a despatch clerk for a carpet manufacturer in Perth. He signed professional forms with Dundee in February 1957, but then had a spell in Hampshire while he underwent National Service in the Royal Army Service Corps. Gilzean made his competitive debut for Dundee in August 1959, and then became a key part of a successful side. He scored 169 goals in 190 appearances for Dundee in the Scottish top flight as Dundee won the Scottish league championship in 1961–62 and reached the semi-finals of the 1962–63 European Cup. In 2009 Gilzean was one of the first inductees in the Dens Park club's Hall of fame.

Tottenham Hotspur
Gilzean joined Tottenham Hotspur in December 1964, moving for a transfer fee of £72,500. He made his first appearance for Tottenham a week later, in a home fixture against Everton.

Gilzean enjoyed a glittering career as a Tottenham player, while he also changed his style of play from being the main goalscorer to being an intelligent and creative forward. He formed an effective goal-scoring partnership alongside crowd favourite Jimmy Greaves, and together they were referred to by fans as the "G-Men". A notable match he was involved in was the 4th round FA Cup in 1966 match against Burnley when he scored a hat-trick, and won the game 4–3 with a late goal. He was a member of the 1967 FA Cup Final winning team. Gilzean continued to be a regular first-team player after the arrival of Martin Chivers in early 1968 from Southampton. 

After strike-partner Greaves moved to West Ham United in March 1970, Gilzean and Chivers formed a new and equally successful goalscoring partnership. This contributed greatly to Tottenham's cup triumphs in the first half of the decade, winning the League Cup in 1971, an all-English 1972 UEFA Cup Final against Wolverhampton Wanderers, and a second League Cup victory in 1973. He earned the moniker "The King of White Hart Lane" while at Spurs. 

The 1973–74 season was Gilzean's last as a professional footballer as Spurs lost the UEFA Cup final to Dutch side Feyenoord Rotterdam. Tottenham awarded Gilzean with a testimonial match, played against Red Star Belgrade in November 1974, to recognise his ten years of service as a Tottenham player.

Highlands Park
Following his retirement from Tottenham, Gilzean played in South Africa for three months with Highlands Park.

International career
Gilzean made his debut for Scotland in November 1963, in a 6–1 win against Norway. He had previously represented his country at Under-23 level and the Scottish League XI. He received four more international caps in the following twelve months while playing for Dundee. He also scored twice for a Scotland Select XI against Tottenham Hotspur in a November 1964 memorial match for Tottenham and Scotland player John White, who had died in tragic circumstances earlier that year.

Gilzean represented Scotland seventeen times during his Spurs career. In total he scored 12 goals in 22 full international appearances for Scotland, between November 1963 and April 1971.

Management career
Gilzean returned to England after his spell in South Africa, to become manager of Stevenage Athletic who he managed for one season from 1975 to 1976.

Personal life
Gilzean stated, whilst playing, that he disliked football and had no intention of furthering his career after playing. He later worked for a transport company in Enfield, only a short distance from White Hart Lane.

When journalist Hunter Davies surveyed the Tottenham Hotspur squad in 1972, Gilzean said that he was supportive of the Conservative Party. His son Ian also became a professional football player. Gilzean died on 8 July 2018, having been diagnosed as suffering from a brain tumour a few weeks earlier.

Career statistics

International goals
Scores and results list Scotland's goal tally first, score column indicates score after each Gilzean goal.

Honours
Dundee
 Scottish league championship: 1961–62

Tottenham Hotspur
 FA Cup: 1967 
 FA Charity Shield: 1967 (shared)
 League Cup (2):  1971, 1973 
 UEFA Cup: 1972

Individual
Inducted to the Scottish Football Hall of Fame: 2009
Inducted to the Dundee FC Hall of Fame: 2009
Inducted to the Tottenham Hotspur Hall of Fame: 2013

Further reading

Ross, Kenny Dundee Champions of Scotland 1961/62 
 Donovan, Mike The King of Dens Park: The Authorised Biography of Alan Gilzean. 2019.

References

Bibliography

External links
 
 Profile Sporting-Heroes.net
 Alan Gilzean-aerial craftsman

1938 births
2018 deaths
Association football forwards
Coupar Angus F.C. players
Dundee Violet F.C. players
Dundee F.C. players
Tottenham Hotspur F.C. players
Highlands Park F.C. players
Scotland international footballers
Scotland under-23 international footballers
Scottish Football Hall of Fame inductees
Scottish Football League players
Scottish Football League representative players
Scottish football managers
Scottish footballers
Footballers from Perth and Kinross
English Football League players
Scottish league football top scorers
UEFA Cup winning players
Scottish Junior Football Association players
Expatriate soccer players in South Africa
Scottish expatriate sportspeople in South Africa
Scottish expatriate footballers
National Football League (South Africa) players
Southern Football League managers
20th-century British Army personnel
Royal Army Service Corps soldiers
FA Cup Final players